The Order of the Loyalty of Sultan Ismail (Darjah Setia Sultan Ismail Johor Yang Amat di-Berkati) is a knighthood order of the sultanate of Johor.

History 
The Order has been founded in 1975.

Classes 
The Order has the following classes of merit:
Knight Grand Companion (Dato' Sri Setia, post-nominal letters : SSIJ)
Knight Companion (Dato' Setia, post-nominal letters : DSIJ)

Attached to the order are two stars known as the Sultan Ismail Star (Bintang Sultan Ismail) in gold and silver, which effectively function as the third and fourth classes of the order.
First class in Gold (crown only) or Pangkat Pertama Emas (post-nominal letters : BSI I)
Second class in Silver or Pangkat Kedua Perak (post-nominal letters : BSI II)

Insignia 
The sash is plain azur blue

Notable recipients

Knight Grand Companion (S.S.I.J) 
 Tunku Abdul Rahman (28 October 1975)
 Iskandar of Johor (28 October 1975)
 Tunku Temenggong Ahmad (28 October 1975) 
 Othman Saat (28 October 1975, revoked 1982)
 Abdul Hamid Mustapha (28 October 1975)
 Ibrahim Ismail of Johor (8 April 1990)
 Tunku Puan Nora (8 April 1996)
 Tunku Puan Zanariah
 Tunku Ismail Idris (22 November 2010)
 Mohamed Noah Omar
 Hussein Onn
 Musa Hitam
 Abdul Kadir Yusof
 Mohamed Rahmat
 Lee San Choon
 Sulaiman Ninam Shah
 Syed Nasir Ismail
 Teh Hong Piow
 Tan Kim Chua
 Tan Hong Chiang

See also 
 Orders, decorations, and medals of Johor
 Order of precedence in Johor
 List of post-nominal letters (Johor)

External links 
World Medal Index, Decorations of Johor
Colecciones Militares (Antonio Prieto Barrio), Decorations of Johor

References 

Johor, Loyalty of Sultan Ismail, Order of the
Loyalty of Sultan Ismail (Johor)